West of the Santa Fe is a 1938 American Western film directed by Sam Nelson and written by Bennett Cohen. The film stars Charles Starrett, Iris Meredith, Dick Curtis, Robert Fiske, LeRoy Mason and Bob Nolan. The film was released on October 3, 1938, by Columbia Pictures.

Plot

Cast          
Charles Starrett as Steve Lawlor
Iris Meredith as Madge Conway
Dick Curtis as Matt Taylor
Robert Fiske as Frank Parker
LeRoy Mason as Marshal McLain
Bob Nolan as Bob
Hank Bell as Hank
Edmund Cobb as Barlow
Clem Horton as Wager
Dick Botiller as Foley 
Edward Hearn as Crane 
Edward LeSaint as Jeff Conway
Buck Connors as Hardpan

References

External links
 

1938 films
American Western (genre) films
1938 Western (genre) films
Columbia Pictures films
Films directed by Sam Nelson
American black-and-white films
1930s English-language films
1930s American films